The gray-backed tailorbird (Orthotomus derbianus) is a species of bird formerly placed in the "Old World warbler" assemblage, it but now placed in the family Cisticolidae. It is native to the Philippine islands of Palawan, Luzon and Catanduanes.

References

grey-backed tailorbird
Birds of Luzon
Birds of Palawan
Fauna of Catanduanes
Endemic birds of the Philippines
grey-backed tailorbird
Taxonomy articles created by Polbot